

The Antoinette III, originally called the Ferber IX or Aeroplane Ferber n° 9, was an early experimental aircraft flown in France. It was based on Ferdinand Ferber's previous design the Ferber n°8, and was quite unlike other Antoinette aircraft. It was renamed when Ferber became a director of the Antoinette company.

The Antoinette III was a two-bay biplane without a fuselage or any other enclosure for the pilot. A single elevator was carried on outriggers ahead of the aircraft, and a fixed fin and horizontal stabiliser behind. The undercarriage was of bicycle configuration and included small outriggers near the wingtips. Power was provided by an Antoinette 8V water cooled V-8 engine driving a tractor propeller.

Between July and September 1908, Ferber made a series of progressively longer flights in the machine, the longest recorded being on 15 September when he covered  in 9 minutes.

Specifications

See also

Notes

References

Opdycke Leonard E. French Aeroplanes Before the Great War Atglen, PA: 1999 
 Taylor M.J.H. Jane's Encyclopedia of Aviation. London: Studio Editions, 1989 p. 63
 World Aircraft Information Files. Brightstar Publishing: London. File 889 Sheet 63.
 The Pioneers:An Anthology

Single-engined tractor aircraft
Biplanes
1900s French experimental aircraft
Antoinette aircraft
Aircraft first flown in 1908